Lambert is an inactive village in Scott County, Missouri, United States. The population was 34 at the 2010 census.

The community has the name of W. C. Lambert, a local judge.

Geography
Lambert is located at  (37.095043, -89.553170).

Demographics

2010 census
As of the census of 2010, there were 34 people, 16 households, and 12 families living in the village. The racial makeup of the village was 100.00% White.

There were 16 households, of which 18.8% had children under the age of 18 living with them, 56.3% were married couples living together, 12.5% had a female householder with no husband present, 6.3% had a male householder with no wife present, and 25.0% were non-families. 18.8% of all households were made up of individuals, and 6.3% had someone living alone who was 65 years of age or older. The average household size was 2.13 and the average family size was 2.42.

The median age in the village was 54 years. 14.7% of residents were under the age of 18; 5.8% were between the ages of 18 and 24; 11.8% were from 25 to 44; 35.3% were from 45 to 64; and 32.4% were 65 years of age or older. The gender makeup of the village was 50.0% male and 50.0% female.

2000 census
As of the census of 2000, there were 49 people, 17 households, and 13 families living in the village. The population density was 942.2 people per square mile (378.4/km2). There were 17 housing units at an average density of 326.9/sq mi (131.3/km2). The racial makeup of the village was 95.92% White, and 4.08% from two or more races.

There were 17 households, out of which 29.4% had children under the age of 18 living with them, 76.5% were married couples living together, and 23.5% were non-families. 11.8% of all households were made up of individuals, and 5.9% had someone living alone who was 65 years of age or older. The average household size was 2.88 and the average family size was 3.31.

In the village, the population was spread out, with 22.4% under the age of 18, 4.1% from 18 to 24, 34.7% from 25 to 44, 24.5% from 45 to 64, and 14.3% who were 65 years of age or older. The median age was 36 years. For every 100 females, there were 96.0 males. For every 100 females age 18 and over, there were 100.0 males.

The median income for a household in the village was $34,375, and the median income for a family was $43,125. Males had a median income of $24,375 versus $13,125 for females. The per capita income for the village was $16,533. There were no families and 6.1% of the population living below the poverty line, including no under eighteens and none of those over 64.

References

Villages in Scott County, Missouri
Villages in Missouri